Erbil Eroğlu (born January 21, 1993) is a Turkish professional basketball player for Sigortam.net İTÜ BB of the Basketball Super League. He 6 ft 4.5 in (1.94 m) tall and he weighs 187 lb (85 kg). He plays the point guard position.

External links
TBLStat.net Profile
Erbil Eroglu at fiba.com

References

1993 births
Living people
Bursaspor Basketbol players
Darüşşafaka Basketbol players
Fenerbahçe men's basketball players
People from Şişli
Basketball players from Istanbul
Turkish men's basketball players
Point guards